Thomas Beaver Free Library and Danville YMCA is a historic library and YMCA located at Danville, Montour County, Pennsylvania. The two attached buildings were built in 1886.  They are -story, sandstone buildings with slate roofs in a combined Queen Anne / Second Empire style.  The buildings feature an octagonal cupola, corbelled stone chimneys, a hipped roof tower, and terra cotta ornament.

It was added to the National Register of Historic Places in 1987.

References

Libraries on the National Register of Historic Places in Pennsylvania
Cultural infrastructure completed in 1886
Buildings and structures in Montour County, Pennsylvania
National Register of Historic Places in Montour County, Pennsylvania
Individually listed contributing properties to historic districts on the National Register in Pennsylvania
YMCA buildings in the United States